The Con Artist is a 2010 Canadian romantic crime comedy film directed by Risa Bramon Garcia and written by Michael Melski and Collin Friesen, starring Rossif Sutherland, Rebecca Romijn, Sarah Roemer, and Donald Sutherland. The film was released straight-to-DVD in the United States on June 14, 2011.

Production companies are Myriad Pictures and Alcina Pictures, in association with Telefilm Canada and the Ontario Media Development Corporation.

Plot
When Vince is paroled after five years in prison for a heist gone wrong, his dangerous and controlling former boss, Kranski, forces him back into a life of crime. Working for Kranski as a car thief, Vince finds solace in welding sculptures out of metal and old car parts in Kranski’s chop shop. When Vince’s raw and evocative sculptures are discovered by calculating art dealer Belinda, his chance for a new life as an artist emerges, as well as romantic complications with Belinda’s gallery assistant, Kristen. Caught between the pressure from Kranski and the demands of the art world, Vince has to cleverly maneuver his way out to become his own man and his own artist.

Cast

Production
The Con Artist was originally titled The Love Child of Andy Warhol and Yoko Ono, but by the time filming began in Toronto, the name was shortened to The Love Child. After being cast in the lead role, Rossif passed the script on to his father, Donald, who liked it enough to join the cast. Principle filming was underway by April 2009, and had wrapped by late July 2009. By January 2010, the title had become The Con Artist.

References

External links
 
 
 

2010 films
2010 crime films
2010 independent films
2010 romantic comedy films
2010s Canadian films
2010s crime comedy films
2010s English-language films
Canadian crime comedy films
Canadian independent films
Canadian romantic comedy films
English-language Canadian films
Films about con artists
Romantic crime films